Leslie "Les"  Sheard (born ) is an English former rugby union and professional rugby league footballer who played in the 1970s and 1980s, and coached rugby league in the 1980s.

Background
Les Sheard worked as a school teacher, and as of 2009 he lives in Devon.

Playing career

International honours
Les Sheard won a cap for England (RL) while at Wakefield Trinity in 1975 against Wales.

County honours
Les Sheard won cap(s) for Yorkshire while at Wakefield Trinity.

Challenge Cup Final appearances
Les Sheard played  in Wakefield Trinity's 3–12 defeat by Widnes in the 1979 Challenge Cup Final during the 1978–79 season at Wembley Stadium, London on Saturday 5 May 1979, in front of a crowd of a crowd of 94,218.

County Cup Final appearances
Les Sheard played as an  interchange/substitute, i.e. number 14, (replacing  Geoffrey Wraith) in Wakefield Trinity's 2-7 defeat by Leeds in the 1973 Yorkshire County Cup Final during the 1973–74 season at Headingley Rugby Stadium, Leeds on Saturday 20 October 1973, and played  in the 13-16 defeat by Hull Kingston Rovers in the 1974 Yorkshire County Cup Final during the 1974–75 season at Headingley Rugby Stadium, Leeds on Saturday 26 October 1974.

Club career
Les Sheard made his début for Wakefield Trinity during March 1972, he appears to have scored no drop-goals (or field-goals as they are currently known in Australasia), but prior to the 1974–75 season all goals, whether; conversions, penalties, or drop-goals, scored 2-points, consequently prior to this date drop-goals were often not explicitly documented, therefore '0' drop-goals may indicate drop-goals not recorded, rather than no drop-goals scored.

References

External links

1940s births
Living people
Castleford Tigers players
England national rugby league team players
English rugby league coaches
English rugby league players
English rugby union players
Huddersfield Giants coaches
Huddersfield Giants players
Place of birth missing (living people)
Rugby league centres
Rugby league fullbacks
Wakefield RFC players
Wakefield Trinity players
York Wasps captains
York Wasps players
Yorkshire rugby league team players